The Danforth Foundation was one of the largest private nonprofit foundations in the St. Louis Metropolitan region. It closed its doors in 2011 after 84 years of operation and more than a billion dollars in grants distributed.

Background
Established in 1927 by Ralston Purina founder William H. Danforth and his wife, the Danforth Foundation grants funded exclusively to the St. Louis region. In the 1950s and 1960s, it funded many projects involving religion and higher education. The Danforth Fellows Program, which supported graduate study in religion for scholars in other fields, was folded into the Society for Values in Higher Education. In 1973, Methodist minister and theologian Merrimon Cuninggim resigned as executive director because of a perceived conflict of interest from a $60 million grant to Washington University in St. Louis authorized by William Henry Danforth Jr., who was then both chairman of the foundation and chancellor of the university.

See also
 Danforth Chapels

References

External links
FoundationCenter.org: Danforth Foundation Shifts Focus, Cuts Staff
MuOhio.edu: About the Danforth Foundation

Educational foundations in the United States
Defunct organizations based in Missouri
Non-profit organizations based in Missouri
Organizations based in St. Louis
Ralston Purina
Organizations established in 1927
Organizations disestablished in 2011
1927 establishments in Missouri
2011 disestablishments in Missouri